"The Soldier" is a poem written by Rupert Brooke. The poem is the fifth in a series of poems entitled 1914. It was published in 1915 in the book 1914 and Other Poems.

It is often contrasted with Wilfred Owen's 1917 antiwar poem "Dulce et Decorum est". The manuscript is located at King's College, Cambridge.

Structure of the poem

Written with fourteen lines in a Petrarchan/Italian sonnet form, the poem is divided into an opening octet, and then followed by a concluding sestet. As far as rhyme scheme, the octet is rhymed after the Shakespearean/Elizabethan (ABAB CDCD) form, while the sestet follows the Petrarchan/Italian (EFG EFG) form. The volta, the shift or point of dramatic change, occurs after the fourth line where Brooke goes from describing the death of the soldier, to his life accomplishments winning of the First World War in 1914, as part of a series of sonnets written by Rupert Brooke. Brooke himself, predominantly a prewar poet, died the year before "The Soldier" was published. "The Soldier", being the conclusion and the finale to Brooke’s 1914 war sonnet series, deals with the death and accomplishments of a soldier.

This sonnet encompasses the memoirs of a deceased soldier who declares his patriotism to his homeland by declaring that his sacrifice will be the eternal ownership of England of the small portion of land where his body is buried. The poem appears to not follow the normal purpose of a Petrarchan/Italian sonnet either. It does not truly go into detail about a predicament/resolution, as is customary with this form; rather, the atmosphere remains constantly in the blissful state of the English soldier.

Cultural influence 
The poem is read aloud twice in the 1969 film, Oh! What a Lovely War. The first time, the poem is read in its entirety by a soldier writing it in the trenches. The second time, a different soldier reads from a paper that 70% casualties occurred at the last battle, and recites the beginning lines, "That there's some corner of a foreign field that is for ever England."

Lyrics in Roger Waters' “The Gunner's Dream” (from the Pink Floyd album The Final Cut) make reference to “The Soldier”.

Implicit references to this poem (and several others) are made in Muse's song “Soldier's Poem” from their album Black Holes & Revelations.

Prior to the first moon landing in 1969, William Safire prepared a speech for U.S. President Richard Nixon to give in case of disaster.  The last line of the prepared address intentionally echoes a similar line from the poem. ("For every human being who looks up at the moon in the nights to come will know that there is some corner of another world that is forever mankind.") This line is in reference to the first few lines of the poem.

The Second World War fiction novel Under an English Heaven, by Robert Radcliffe, tells the story of a Flying Fortress bomber crew in the USAAF 520th Bombardment Group, based on a Suffolk airbase.  The novel takes its title directly from this piece, and although not mentioning the poem directly, comparisons are drawn between "The Charge of the Light Brigade" and particular bombing missions over occupied Europe which elicited a very high casualty rate, underlining the futility of the survival odds for any given bomber crew.

English singer songwriter Al Stewart makes reference to Brooke in his song "Somewhere in England (1915)" from the album A Beach Full of Shells: “And the maker of rhymes on the deck who is going to die, in the corner of some foreign field that will make him so famous, as the light temporarily shines to illumine his pages.” The same line was used in the song The Gunner's Dream by Pink Floyd.

The poem is used as the theme for The Listener Crossword 4343, "Bear, Bear Bearing". The title hints at "Rupert Brook-e", and features from the poem are hidden in the grid.

In the Blackadder Goes Forth episode "Major Star", Captain Blackadder says "If I should die, think only this of me, I'll be back to get you."

In the film All the King's Men the poem is twice quoted verbatim: once early in the story as the inexperienced soldiers boast of coming glorious death in battle and again near the end at the funeral of a soldier killed in Gallipoli. The contrast in these two recitations (in tone, character, setting, purpose) illustrates the nuance of the poem beyond any patriotism/anti-war dichotomy.

References

External links

Poem text: https://www.poemist.com/rupert-brooke/1914-v-the-soldier
1914, and Other Poems (1915) at Internet Archive
 (multiple versions)

World War I poems
1914 poems